Ngaire, sometimes anglicised as Nyree, is a name most often found in New Zealand. Its specific origins are unclear, except that it originated in New Zealand, where the pronunciation of the name follows Maori rather than English phonetics. A possible origin is given by the 19th century spelling of the Taranaki town Ngaere, meaning "swamp", the spelling of which was corrected from Ngaire to Ngaere in 1909.

Unreferenced sources claim that the word originally referred to a small swamp flower, or that it means . Referenced sources suggest that the name does have a link to marshy terrain. It may refer to:

People
Ngaiire (born 1984), Papua New Guinean singer, also known as Ngaire Joseph
Ngaire Drake (born 1949), New Zealand marathon runner
Ngaire Fuata, New Zealand singer known as simply Ngaire
Ngaire Kerse, New Zealand medical academic
Ngaire Lane (1925–2021), New Zealand Olympic swimmer
Ngaire Smith (born 1979), Australian hockey player
Ngaire Thomas (1943–2012), New Zealand author
Ngaire Woods (born 1962/63), New Zealand-born academic in England
Nyree Dawn Porter (1936–2001), New Zealand-born actress
Nyree Kindred (born 1980), Welsh paralympic swimmer
Nyree Roberts (born 1976), American basketball player

Other
Ngaere, a township in Taranaki, New Zealand
Ngaire (album), 1991 album by Ngaire Fuata
"Ngaire", a song by The Mutton Birds' on the 1993 album Salty
Ngaire Munroe, a fictional character in New Zealand television programmes Outrageous Fortune and Westside
Ngaire Thompson, a fictional character in New Zealand television programme Shortland Street

See also
Nairi (disambiguation)